Kwandang is a town in Indonesia and the regency seat of the Regency of North Gorontalo.

References

Populated places in Gorontalo (province)
Regency seats of Gorontalo